The Hechal Yehuda Synagogue (Beit haKnesset Hechal Yehuda), also commonly known as the Recanati synagogue (Beit haKnesset Recanati), is one of approximately 500 synagogues in Tel Aviv, Israel. Situated on the Menahem ben Saruq street in the city's centre, it is often referred to as the Seashell Synagogue (Beit haKnesset Konkit) because of its unusual shape resembling a seashell. The design is inspired by the seashells on the shores of the Greek city of Thessaloniki, which is the hometown of the wealthy Recanati family and the synagogue's architect, Yitzhak Toledano. It was the Recanati family who donated the money for the synagogue. It is affiliated with Orthodox Judaism.

History
The Hechal Yehuda Synagogue was built in memory of the Jewish community of Thessaloniki, which was almost completely destroyed during the Holocaust. It is named after Yehuda Leon Recanati. The construction of the synagogue was completed in 1980, after both Toledano and Recanati had died. Today most worshippers at the synagogue are Greek-Sephardi Jews originating from Thessaloniki.

Architecture
The north bare concrete facade is decorated with bas-reliefs of traditional Jewish motifs and symbols, made by artist Yechezkel Kimchi, while the coloured-glass windows, that present motifs from Jewish holidays, were made by the local artist Josef Shealtiel. The shell-like design creates an internal space which enables the congregation to see and to hear from wherever they are seated. The synagogue, incorporating two floors, has room for 600 persons, 400 men and 200 women in separated galleries.

See also
Architecture in Israel
List of synagogues in Israel

External links

References

Synagogues in Tel Aviv
Heichal Yehuda, Tel Aviv
Heichal Yehuda, Tel Aviv
Heichal Yehuda, Tel Aviv
Heichal Yehuda, Tel Aviv
1980 establishments in Israel
Synagogues completed in 1980
Expressionist architecture
Modernist architecture in Israel